Canadian singer Celine Dion has released 27 studio albums, seven live albums, 19 compilation albums, and 25 box sets. Recognized as the "Priestess of Pop", she has sold 53.2 million albums in the United States according to Neilsen SoundScan, making her the second best-selling female artists in the country since Nielsen began tracking sales in 1991. In 2003, Dion was honored by International Federation of the Phonographic Industry for selling 50 million albums in Europe. Guinness World Records recognises her as the Top Selling Album Act in Europe with 33 million certified album sales since 1996 . Billboard ranked her as the second best-selling female album artist of the 2000s Decade in the United States with 17.3 million sold via Soundscan. In 2008, Dion was recognized as the Best-selling International Artist in South Africa. Billboard ranked Dion as the 6th Greatest Billboard 200 female solo artist of all time & the 8th Greatest female solo artist of all time. Dion is also the best-selling Canadian artist of all time and the best-selling artist in the Nielsen SoundScan era in Canada (from 1996). 

Her debut album, La voix du bon Dieu was issued in 1981. In the '80s, Dion released her French-language albums in Canada, with several compilation albums issued also in France. Her first English-language album, entitled Unison was released in 1990 and has sold over four million copies worldwide. It was followed by Dion chante Plamondon in 1991 and Celine Dion in 1992. The latter became one of six of her albums to be certified Diamond in Canada for shipments of at least one million units. Dion's popularity became well-established with her 1993 album, The Colour of My Love, which topped the charts in various countries, including the United Kingdom, Canada, and Australia, and has sold 20 million copies around the world. In the United States, it was certified six-times platinum. Released in 1995, D'eux became the best-selling French-language album in history, with sales of 10 million copies worldwide. In France alone, D'eux spent 44 weeks at the top of the chart and has sold 4.5 million units, becoming the best-selling album of all time. It also became Dion's first out of six Diamond-certified albums in France.

Falling into You (1996) and Let's Talk About Love (1997) were major successes for Dion, both reaching number-one in many countries around the world, and becoming two of the best-selling albums of all time, with sales of over 32 and 31 million copies, respectively. Both albums were certified Diamond in the United States, with Falling into You achieving later twelve-times platinum certification for shipments of 12 million units and Let's Talk About Love eleven-times platinum for 11 million copies. Falling into You also won the Grammy Award for Album of the Year and Best Pop Vocal Album in 1997. Let's Talk About Love became the first album certified ten-times platinum by the IFPI for sales of at least 10 million copies in Europe. In 1998, Dion released another French-language album, S'il suffisait d'aimer and her first English-language holiday album, These Are Special Times, which became the fourth best-selling Christmas album in the United States in the Nielsen SoundScan era, with sales of 5.6 million copies. Worldwide, it has sold twelve million units. A greatest hits compilation with seven new recordings, All the Way... A Decade of Song was issued in November 1999, topping the charts around the world, and selling over 22 million copies, globally. In the United States, All the Way... A Decade of Song became the best-selling greatest hits album by a female artist in the Nielsen SoundScan era where it topped the eight million sales mark. In Japan, it was certified two-times Million for shipments of two million copies.

In March 2002, after a two-year break, Dion returned to music with the album, A New Day Has Come, which topped the charts in many countries and has sold 12 million copies, worldwide. During the five-year run of her Las Vegas residency show, A New Day..., Dion released five studio albums: One Heart (2003), 1 fille & 4 types (2003), Miracle (2004), D'elles (2007) and Taking Chances (2007). After Taking Chances World Tour and another break, she started her second Las Vegas residency show, Celine in March 2011. In 2012, Dion began recording songs for her new French and English-language albums. Sans attendre was released in November 2012 and topped the charts in Francophone countries. It became the best-selling album of 2012 in France where it was certified Diamond. Loved Me Back to Life was issued in November 2013 and became Dion's 13th number-one album in the Nielsen SoundScan era in Canada and 11th to debut at the top of the chart. It also reached number two in the United States, and number three in the United Kingdom and France.  Loved Me Back to Life was certified four-times platinum in Canada, two-times platinum in France and platinum in the United Kingdom. In August 2016, a few months after her husband and manager René Angélil died, Dion released a new French album, Encore un soir. It topped the charts in Francophone countries and was certified Diamond in France.

Dion has sold an estimated of 200 million to 250 million records worldwide and is recognized as one of the world's best-selling music artists. In 2004, she received the Chopard Diamond Award at the World Music Awards recognizing her status as "the best-selling female artist" of all time. In 2007, Dion was honored with the Legend Award at the World Music Awards in recognition of her global success and outstanding contribution to the music industry. She's also the first and only female singer to have tallied three 8-million sellers in the US since 1991. Her albums Falling into You, Let's Talk About Love, All the Way... A Decade of Song, The Colour of My Love and These Are Special Times are among the top 100 certified albums according to the RIAA. Four of her albums (Let's Talk About Love, All the Way... A Decade of Song, Falling into You and These Are Special Times) are among top 10 of the best-selling Canadian albums in the SoundScan era in Canada.

Studio albums

1980s

1990s

2000s

2010s

Live albums

1980s

1990s

2000s

2010s

Compilation albums

1980s

1990s

2000s

2010s

Box sets

1990s

2000s

2010s

See also

 Celine Dion singles discography
 Celine Dion videography
 List of best-selling Western artists in Japan
 Best-selling albums in the United States since Nielsen SoundScan tracking began
 List of best-selling albums
 List of best-selling albums by women
 List of best-selling albums in Australia
 List of best-selling albums in Belgium
 List of best-selling albums in Brazil
 List of best-selling albums in Canada
 List of best-selling albums in Europe
 List of best-selling albums in France
 List of best-selling albums in Germany
 List of best-selling albums in Japan
 List of best-selling albums in New Zealand
 List of best-selling albums in the United States
 List of best-selling albums of the 1990s in the United Kingdom
 List of best-selling Christmas/holiday albums in the United States
 List of best-selling music artists
 List of diamond-certified albums in Canada
 List of fastest-selling albums

Notes

References

Dion, Celine